Barwick is a surname. Notable people with the surname include:

Bill Barwick, American Western music singer-songwriter and voice-over artist
Brian Barwick, English sports official
Daniel Barwick (born 1968), American college president
Diane Barwick (1938–1986), Canadian-born anthropologist, researcher and teacher
Doug Barwick (born 1962), Australian rules footballer
Garfield Barwick (1903–1997),  Chief Justice of the High Court of Australia
Greg Barwick, Australian rugby league player
John Barwick (theologian) (fl. 1340), Anglo-Scots theologian 
John Barwick (1612–1664), English royalist churchman and Dean of St. Paul's Cathedral
Julianna Barwick, American musician
Paul Barwick (born 1946), American LGBT rights activist and same-sex marriage pioneer
Peter Barwick (1619–1705), English physician and author
Sandy Barwick (born 1949), New Zealand female ultramarathon runner
Steve Barwick (born 1960), Welsh cricketer
Terry Barwick, English football player
Tony Barwick (1934–1993), British television scriptwriter
Vic Barwick (born 1879), Australian rules footballer

English-language surnames